Lapon may refer to:

Lapon (fish), a type of scorpionfish
, the name of more than one United States Navy ship